On Top of Old Smoky is a 1953 American Western film directed by George Archainbaud and starring Gene Autry and Gail Davis. It takes its title from the song "On Top of Old Smoky".

Cast
Gene Autry as Gene Autry  
Champion as Champ  
Gail Davis as Jen Larrabee  
Grandon Rhodes as Doc Judson  
Sheila Ryan as Lila  
Kenne Duncan as Mcquaid  
The Cass County Boys as Cass County Boys Band  
Smiley Burnette as Smiley

References

External links

1953 Western (genre) films
American Western (genre) films
Films directed by George Archainbaud
Columbia Pictures films
American black-and-white films
1950s English-language films
1950s American films